"El Malei Rachamim" (Hebrew: אֵל מָלֵא רַחֲמִים, lit., "God full of Mercy", or "Merciful God"), is a Jewish prayer for the soul of a person who has died, usually recited at the graveside during the burial service and at memorial services during the year.

Place in the Liturgy
In the Eastern Ashkenazi liturgy, the prayer is usually chanted by a chazzan for the ascension of the souls of the dead on the following occasions: during the funeral; at an unveiling of the tombstone; Yizkor (Remembrance) service on the four of the Jewish festivals, Yom Kippur, Shmini Atzeret, and the last day of Pesach and Shavuot; on the Yahrzeit on a day when there is public reading from the Torah, or the closest date before the Yahrzeit; and on other occasions on which the memory of the dead is recalled. In the Western Ashkenazic liturgy, this prayer is usually not recited, although it has been adopted on various occasions in certain Western Ashkenazic communities (including K'hal Adath Jeshurun in Washington Heights).

In the Sephardi liturgy, a similar prayer is called Hashkavah  and is recited by the reader of the Torah on Mondays and Thursdays.

The recitation of the prayer in both Ashkenazi and Sephardi liturgies is usually accompanied by pledges for the donation of charity in memory of the deceased.

Wording of the Prayer

The prayer has a fixed structure, composed of a specific text in which is incorporated the deceased's name (in the case of an individual's commemoration), or a description of the deceased (in the case of the commemoration of a group).

Version for a deceased individual

The text of the mourner's prayer varies slightly depending on the gender of the one for whom is said.

If the mourner's prayer is recited on behalf of a woman, the following text is recited:

If the mourner's prayer is recited on behalf of a man, the following text is recited:

The prayer refers to a charitable pledge by the person saying it, and thus one should give charity

Version for the Remembrance of IDF Soldiers

אֵל מָלֵא רַחֲמִים שׁוכֵן בַּמְּרומִים, הַמְצֵא מְנוּחָה נְכונָה עַל כַּנְפֵי הַשְּׁכִינָה, בְּמַעֲלות קְדושִׁים, טְהורִים וְגִבּורִים, כְּזהַר הָרָקִיעַ מַזְהִירִים. לְנִשְׁמות חַיָּלֵי צְבָא הֲגָנָה לְיִשְׂרָאֵל וְלוֹחָמֵי הָמַחְתָרוֹת שֶׁנָּפְלוּ בְּמִלְחֲמות יִשְׂרָאֵל, וְכל הַלּוחֲמִים בְּמַעַרְכות הָעָם שֶׁחֵרְפוּ נַפְשָׁם לָמוּת עַל קְדֻשַּׁת הַשֵּׁם, וּבְעֶזְרַת אֱלהֵי מַעַרְכות יִשְׂרָאֵל הֵבִיאוּ לִתְקוּמַת הָאֻמָּה וְהַמְּדִינָה וְלִגְאֻלַּת הָאָרֶץ וְעִיר הָאֱלהִים וכל אלה שנרצחו בארץ ומחוצה לה בידי המרצחים מארגוני הטרור׃

לָכֵן בַּעַל הָרַחֲמִים יַסְתִּירֵם בְּסֵתֶר כְּנָפָיו לְעולָמִים, וְיִצְרור בִּצְרור הַחַיִּים אֶת נִשְׁמָתָם. ה' הוּא נַחֲלָתָם, בְּגַן עֵדֶן (תְּהֵא) מְנוּחָתָם, וְיָנוּחוּ בְּשָׁלום עַל מִשְׁכָּבָם, וְיַעַמְדוּ לְגורָלָם לְקֵץ הָיָּמִין, וְנאמַר אָמֵן׃

Merciful God who dwells above, provide a sure rest on the wings of the Divine Presence, amongst the holy and pure and heroic who shine as brightly as the sky, to the souls of the soldiers of the Israel Defense Forces and the underground fighters who fell in Israel's wars, and all the fighters in the nation's battles who gave their lives to die for the sanctity of Hashem who, with the help of the God of Israel's battles, brought about the establishment of the nation and the State and the reclamation of the land and the City of God, and all those who were murdered in the Land and outside it by the murderers of the terrorist groups. Hence, the Merciful One will shade them forever in his wings, and will bind them in the bundle of life. The LORD is their inheritance, the Garden of Eden their resting place, and they will rest in peace on upon their beds, and they will receive their reward at the end of days. So let us say, Amen.

Version for the Remembrance of Victims of the Holocaust

אֵל מָלֵא רַחֲמִים שׁוֹכֵן בַּמְּרוֹמִים, הַמְצֵא מְנוּחָה נְכוֹנָה עַל כַּנְפֵי הַשְּׁכִינָה, בְּמַעֲלוֹת קְדוֹשִׁים וטְהוֹרִים כְּזוֹהַר הָרָקִיע מַזְהִירִים אֶת כָּל הַנְּשָׁמוֹת שֶׁל שֵׁשֶׁת מִילְיוֹנֵי הַיְּהוּדִים, חַלְלֵי הַשּׁוֹאָה בְּאֵירוֹפָּה, שֶׁנֶּהֶרְגוּ, שֶׁנִּשְׁחֲטוּ, שֶׁנִּשְׂרְפוּ וְשֶׁנִּסְפּוּ עַל קִדּוּשׁ הַשֵׁם, בִּידֵי הַמְרַצְּחִים הַגֶּרְמָנִים הָנַאצִים וְעוֹזְרֵיהֶם מִשְּׁאָר הֶעַמִּים. לָכֵן בַּעַל הָרַחֲמִים יַסְתִּירֵם בְּסֵתֶר כְּנָפָיו לְעוֹלָמִים, וְיִצְרוֹר בִּצְרוֹר הַחַיִּים אֶת נִשְׁמוֹתֵיהֶם, ה' הוּא נַחֲלָתָם, בְּגַן עֵדֶן תְּהֵא מְנוּחָתָם, וְיַעֶמְדוּ לְגוֹרָלָם לְקֵץ הַיָּמִין, וְנֹאמַר אָמֵן׃

Merciful God, who dwells above, provide a sure rest upon the Divine Presence's wings, amongst of the holy and the pure, whose shining resembles the sky's, all the souls of the six million Jews, victims of the European Holocaust, who were murdered, slaughtered, burnt and exterminated for the Sanctification of the Name, by the German Nazi assassins and their helpers from the rest of the peoples. Therefore, the Master of Mercy will protect them forever, from behind the hiding of his wings, and will tie their souls with the rope of life. The Everlasting is their heritage, the Garden of Eden shall be their resting room, and they shall rest peacefully upon their lying place, they will stand for their fate at the end of days, and let us say: Amen

Cultural usage
From this prayer, the poet Yehuda Amichai wrote his poem "El malei rachamim", starting with the words:אֶל מָלֵא רַחֲמִים
אִלְמָלֵא הָאֵל מְלֵא רַחֲמִים
הָיוּ הָרַחֲמִים בָּעוֹלָם וְלֹא רַק בּוֹ
(the full text of the poem). "God, full of mercy / If God were not so full of mercy / There would be mercy in the world, not just in Him."

References

Jewish culture
Bereavement in Judaism
Jewish prayer and ritual texts
Hebrew words and phrases in Jewish prayers and blessings